Portnancon  is a small remote crofting township, and former fishing station, on the west shore of Loch Eriboll in Sutherland, Scottish Highlands in the Scottish council area of Highland.

Only a few buildings remain of the fishing station, in Portnacon, or Port-na-con, meaning "Port of the Dogs". The fishing pier was also used by a ferry, which crossed the loch until the 1930s.

Populated places in Sutherland

nl:Aberarder